Battle of Vyborg Bay can refer to three battles:

Battle of Vyborg Bay (1790), between Russia and Sweden during the Russo-Swedish War (1788–90)
Battle of Vyborg (1918), when Vyborg was captured by the Whites from the Reds during the Finnish Civil War
Battle of Vyborg Bay (1944), between the Soviet Union and Finland during World War II